The Parliament of Curaçao consist of 21 members, each elected for a four-year term in a general election. Curaçao president of parliament is Charetti America-Francisca. The first Parliament was installed on 10 October 2010, following the dissolution of the Netherlands Antilles, and consisted of the members of the island council elected on 27 August 2010.

The first Speaker of the Parliament was Ivar Asjes (Pueblo Soberano), while Amerigo Thodé (Movementu Futuro Korsou) was the Deputy Speaker.

The incumbent Speaker of Parliament is Charetti America-Francisca.

Speakers

2021 general election

Building 

The parliament is housed in the Statengebouw on the Julianaplein in Punda. The building has 21 steps representing the 21 seats. Between 2010 and 2014, the parliament met in the building of the Island Council on Ansinghstraat, because the building was being renovated.

References

External links
 

 

Curaçao
Politics of Curaçao
2010 establishments in the Netherlands